Pumpkin is an unincorporated community in Paulding County, in the U.S. state of Georgia.

History
Pumpkin takes its name from nearby Pumpkinvine Creek. A post office called Pumpkin was established in 1880, and remained in operation until 1891.

References

Unincorporated communities in Paulding County, Georgia
Unincorporated communities in Georgia (U.S. state)